Tide-way (foaled 1933 – after 1943) was a British Thoroughbred racehorse and broodmare. She was rated one of the best British two-year-old fillies of 1935 when she won twice from four starts. She won the 1000 Guineas on her debut as a three-year-old but finished unplaced in the Epsom Oaks and never ran again. As a broodmare she produced the Eclipse Stakes winner Gulf Stream.

Background
Tide-way was a brown mare bred and owned by Edward Stanley, 17th Earl of Derby. During her racing career she was trained by Colledge Leader at Lord Derby's Stanley House stable in Newmarket, Suffolk. Physically, she was described as "a charming filly, perhaps a little light on the leg, but level of back and of great quality".

Tide-way was sired by Fairway, an outstanding racehorse who won the St Leger, the Eclipse Stakes and two runnings of the Champion Stakes. At stud his other winners included Blue Peter, Watling Street, Garden Path, Pay Up and Fair Trial. Tide-way's dam Drift was a successful racehorse but an even better broodmare whose other foals included Sun Stream and Heliopolis.

Racing career

1935: two-year-old season
At Royal Ascot in June Tide-way showed good early speed butfinished unplaced behind Fair Ranee in the Queen Mary Stakes. In the following month at Newmarket Racecourse the filly started favourite for the Fulbourne Stakes and won "fairly and squarely" from the colt Pay Up. She went on to win the Ham Produce Stakes at Goodwood Racecourse and was unplaced on her only other start.

In the Free Handicap, a ranking of the year's best juveniles, Tide-Way was rated the third best filly behind Sansonnet (National Stakes and Crosspatch (Molecomb Stakes).

1936: three-year-old season
In the 123rd running of the 1000 Guineas over the Rowley Mile course on 1 May Tide-way was ridden by Dick Perryman and started at odds of 100/30 against 21 opponents. Racing down the centre of the wide track, Tide-way was in front soon after half-way, fought off a challenge from the favourite Ferrybridge and pulled clear in the final strides to record a "very popular victory". She won by one and a half lengths from her stablemate Feola, with Ferrybridge a neck away in third.

Tide-way was aimed at the Epsom Oaks but was found to be "not herself" and was considered a doubtful runner in the week before the race. Leader also had problems training the filly owing to the exceptionally firm ground in the early summer of 1936. She nevertheless started favourite and appeared be going very well as the runners approached the straight but tired badly and finished eighth behind Lovely Rosa.

Tide-way did not race again and was retired at the end of the season.

Assessment and honours
In their book, A Century of Champions, based on the Timeform rating system, John Randall and Tony Morris rated Tide-way a "poor" winner of the 1000 Guineas.

Breeding record
After her retirement from racing, Tide-way became a broodmare at Lord Derby's stud. She produced at least four foals between 1938 and 1943:

Estuary, a bay filly, foaled in 1938, sired by Orwell
Ebb and Flow, bay filly, 1940, by Solario
Forest Law, brown filly, 1942, by Bois Roussel
Gulf Stream, bay colt, 1943, by Hyperion. Won Eclipse Stakes, second in Epsom Derby.

Pedigree

 Tide-way was inbred 3 × 4 to Canterbury Pilgrim, meaning that this mare appears in both the third and fourth generations of her pedigree. She was also inbred 4 × 4 to St Simon.

References

1933 racehorse births
Racehorses bred in the United Kingdom
Racehorses trained in the United Kingdom
Thoroughbred family 8-g
1000 Guineas winners